Tiago is a given and a family name, being one of the Portuguese equivalents of the names Jacob and James. Its archaic spelling, used mostly in Brazil, is Thiago. 

Tiago may also refer to:

Tiago (horse) (foaled 2004), an American racehorse
"Tiago" (song), by French singer Kendji Girac from his 2018 album Amigo
Tata Tiago, an Indian hatchback automobile

Places
 São Tiago, Brazilian city in the state of Minas 
 Santiago, Isabela, Philippines
 Santiago de Chile, capital and largest city of Chile
 Santiago de Compostela, city in Galicia, Spain
 Santiago de Cuba, second largest city of Cuba
 Santiago de los Caballeros, second largest city of the Dominican Republic
 , m any applications

People with the given name
Tiago Cardoso (disambiguation), many applications of Tiago Cardoso / Thiago Cardoso
Bebé (born 1990), real name Tiago Manuel Dias Correia, Portuguese football player
Tiago (footballer, born 1984), full name Tiago dos Santos Roberto, Brazilian football forward
Tiago Ferreira (footballer, born 1975) (born 1975), Portuguese retired football player
Tiago Godinho (born 1984), Portuguese tennis player
Tiago Ilori (born 1993), Portuguese footballer
Tiago Magalhães (born 1981), Brazilian baseball player
Tiago Mendes (born 1981), Portuguese football player known simply as Tiago
Tiago Pinto (born 1988), Portuguese football player
Tiago Pires (footballer) (born 1987), Portuguese football player
Tiago Henrique Gomes da Rocha (born 1988), Brazilian serial killer and robber
Tiago Santos (born 2002), Portuguese footballer
Tiago Silva (footballer, born 1979) (born 1979), Brazilian football player
Tiago Splitter (born 1985), Brazilian professional basketball player playing in the NBA
Tiago (wrestler) (born 1987), ring name of Arturo Santos Hernández, Mexican professional wrestler

People with the surname
Jacksen F. Tiago (born 1968), Brazilian footballer and manager
Severo Tiago (born 1903), Portuguese football player

See also
 Thiago (disambiguation)
 Diego (disambiguation)
 Jacob

Surnames from given names
Portuguese masculine given names